Bharatiya Janata Party, Maharashtra (or BJP Maharashtra) is a state unit of the Bharatiya Janata Party in the Indian state of Maharashtra The headquarters is located in Mumbai

The BJP came into being after a split from the Janata party. The prominent members of BJP had been the part of the Bharatiya Jana Sangh founded by Syama Prasad Mukherjee. Jana Sangh was the political arm of Rashtriya Swayamsevak Sangh and was dissolved in 1977. On 12 August 2022, Chandrashekhar Bawankule was appointed by the party leadership as the president of the BJP Maharashtra.

Electoral History

Lok Sabha elections

Vidhan Sabha elections

Leadership

Chief Minister

Deputy Chief Ministers

Leader of the OppositionMaharashtra Legislative Assembly

Leader of the OppositionMaharashtra Legislative Council

Presidents

See also
Bharatiya Janata Party
National Democratic Alliance
Shiv Sena
Balasahebanchi Shiv Sena
Rashtriya Samaj Paksha
Maharashtra Navnirman Sena

References 

Bharatiya Janata Party
Maharashtra